Jaime Fernandes Magalhães (born 10 July 1962) is a Portuguese retired footballer who played as a right midfielder.

During his professional career, he represented Porto for 15 seasons.

Club career
Born in Porto, Magalhães was 14 when he joined local FC Porto's youth system. He made his senior debut four years later, as the northerners were coached by Austrian Hermann Stessl.

Magalhães was an important player in the 1983–84 season, with Porto finishing second to S.L. Benfica in the Primeira Liga and also reaching that campaign's UEFA Cup Winners' Cup final; in the following year he scored a career-best 11 goals, as the club managed to end in the top position in domestic competition.

Magalhães had several offers to leave Porto, but ultimately stayed and won a total of seven leagues, adding in 1987 the European Cup and playing the entire final against FC Bayern Munich. Under Bobby Robson he became a fringe player, and left in the 1995 summer having appeared in well more than 300 official matches; a move to another side in the north, Leça FC, was then arranged, but he retired at the end of the campaign after the modest team retained their top flight status, but with the player contributing rarely.

Magalhães was chosen by Portuguese sports newspaper Record as one of the best 100 Portuguese football players ever.

International career
Magalhães made his debut for Portugal on 18 November 1981, in a 2–1 win against Scotland for the 1982 FIFA World Cup qualifiers, at the age of just 19. He was overlooked for the squad that appeared at UEFA Euro 1984, but represented the nation at the 1986 World Cup, earning a total of 20 caps (no goals).

Honours
Primeira Liga: 1984–85, 1985–86, 1987–88, 1989–90, 1991–92, 1992–93, 1994–95
Taça de Portugal: 1983–84, 1987–88, 1990–91, 1993–94
Supertaça Cândido de Oliveira: 1981, 1983, 1984, 1986, 1991, 1993
European Cup: 1986–87
UEFA Super Cup: 1987
Intercontinental Cup: 1987

References
DIAS, Rui, Record – 100 Melhores do Futebol Português – Volume I (Record – The 100 best of Portuguese Football, 2002, EDISPORT).

References

External links

1962 births
Living people
Footballers from Porto
Portuguese footballers
Association football midfielders
Primeira Liga players
FC Porto players
Leça F.C. players
Portugal youth international footballers
Portugal under-21 international footballers
Portugal international footballers
1986 FIFA World Cup players